Kevin Dale Roberts (born January 16, 1966) is a former politician who served one term in the Texas House of Representatives for District 126 in Harris County. He resides in Spring, Texas.

State Representative election of 2016

Roberts ran without opposition in the Republican legislative primary on March 1, 2016, after the Republican incumbent, Patricia Harless, did not seek re-election. In the general election on November 8, 2016, Roberts received 58 percent of the ballots cast defeating Democrat, Joy Dawson-Thomas, and Libertarian Party candidate, Eric Moquin.

Congressional election of 2018

Upon the announcement of incumbent U.S. Representative Ted Poe's retirement effective in January 2019, Roberts announced his candidacy for the seat against a crowded field of nine other challengers. After Roberts placed first in the March 6th primary with 33 percent of the vote, Roberts faced retired U.S. Navy SEAL Dan Crenshaw in a primary runoff election. A negative super PAC, funded by Roberts' brother-in-law, Mark Lanier, ran ads opposing Crenshaw's candidacy for the nomination.

Roberts was defeated by Crenshaw in the May 22 Republican run-off primary by more than a 2 to 1 margin. Roberts finished with 30.2 percent of the vote, compared to Crenshaw's 69.8 percent. Crenshaw won the seat in the general election on November 6, 2018.

References 

1966 births
Living people
21st-century American politicians
American chief operating officers
Republican Party members of the Texas House of Representatives
Texas Tech University alumni
Politicians from Amarillo, Texas
Politicians from Houston
People from Tomball, Texas